Albi is a commune in Tarn Department, France.

Albi may refer to:

Places
France
 Albi Cathedral ("Basilique Cathédrale Sainte-Cécile d'Albi"), begun as a fortress in 1287, the most important Catholic building in Albi, Tarn
Arrondissement of Albi, an arrondissement of France in the Tarn department in the Midi-Pyrénées region
Circuit d'Albi, a French motorsport race track near Le Sequestre

Iran
 Albi, Iran, a village in East Azerbaijan Province

Italy
 Albi, Calabria, a comune in the Province of Catanzaro

Romania
 Albi, a village in Slimnic Commune, Sibiu County

United States
 Joe Albi Stadium, an outdoor athletic stadium in the City of Spokane, Washington

See also

 Albee (disambiguation)

People
 Albi Kondi, an Albanian footballer

Entertainment
 Bedawwar A Albi, the third studio album by the Lebanese singer Amal Hijazi
 Albi the Racist Dragon, a fictional dragon who is racist against Albanians and subject of a song by New Zealand band Flight of the Conchords

Other uses
 Council of Albi, a Roman Catholic Council that was held in 1254
 US Albi, a French association football team

See also 
 Albigenses, or "Cathars", a Christian dualist movement in some areas of Southern Europe, particularly northern Italy and southern France
 Albigensian Crusade, or Cathar Crusade (1209–1229), a Catholic extinction campaign against Catharism in the south of France
 ALB (disambiguation)
 Alby (disambiguation)
 Albis (disambiguation)